Thysanotus multiflorus, is a monoecious perennial flowering plant with long stems accompanied with a cluster of foliage underneath. This plant is endemic to the Southwest Australia. The flowers of the plant are bright mauve and there are 3 petals, each decorated with fringed edges.

Distribution
Thysanotus multiflorus  originates from Southwestern Australia, southeast of Perth. It is considered to be distributed in the IBRA regions, Avon Wheatbelt, Esperance Plains, Jarrah Forest, Swan Coastal Plain and  Warren.

Habitat and ecology
Thysanotus multiflorus flourishes in a dry climate with low humidity. This plant grows in a region that has a Mediterranean climate with wet winters and dry summers.  The Government of Western Australia's Department of Environment and Conservation considers the plants conservation code to be not threatened. Thysanotus multiflorus is able to grow in soil that has excellent drainage, but is also able to grow in more sandy soil.  However, if the soil is too fine, it may cause the roots to rot.

Morphology
Thysanotus multiflorus has fibrous roots. It has clusters of bright flowers with 3 mauve-colored elliptic petals and fringed edges.  Each flower usually contains 3 stamens with long curved anthers and equal filaments.  The style is also curved and usually seen pointing in the opposite direction of the anthers. The cylindrical seeds are accompanied by stalked arils. The stems of the flowers can grow up to 14 inches and underneath is a clump of foliage without flowers. The foliage tends to be glossy and smooth.

Usage
This plant is usually used in horticulture.

References

External links 
 
 

Lomandroideae